Iolaus bellina, the white-spot sapphire, is a butterfly in the family Lycaenidae. It is found in Sierra Leone, Liberia, Ivory Coast, Ghana, Togo, Nigeria, Cameroon, São Tomé and Príncipe, Gabon, the Republic of the Congo, the Democratic Republic of the Congo, Uganda, Kenya and Tanzania. The habitat consists of forests.

Adults of both sexes have been observed feeding from flowers.

The larvae feed on Loranthus species.

Subspecies
Iolaus bellina bellina (Sierra Leone, Liberia, Ivory Coast, Ghana, Togo, Nigeria: south and the Cross River loop, western Cameroon)
Iolaus bellina exquisita (Riley, 1928) (southern Cameroon, Gabon, Congo, Democratic Republic of the Congo, Uganda, western Kenya, north-western Tanzania)
Iolaus bellina maris (Riley, 1928) (São Tomé)

References

External links

Die Gross-Schmetterlinge der Erde 13: Die Afrikanischen Tagfalter. Plate XIII 68 d

Butterflies described in 1880
Iolaus (butterfly)
Butterflies of Africa